Butterfield Pass is a gap in the range of the Maricopa Mountains in Maricopa County, Arizona.

History
This pass was originally known as Pima Pass during the years the Butterfield Overland Mail route ran through it. Later it was renamed to memorialize the stage line.

References

Landforms of Maricopa County, Arizona